Stuart Smith (1915-1969) was a professional American football player who played running back for two seasons for the Pittsburgh Steelers.

References

1915 births
American football running backs
Pittsburgh Steelers players
Bucknell Bison football players
1969 deaths
People from Montour Falls, New York